Human rights in Cape Verde are addressed under the national constitution.

The 2009 Human Rights Report by the United States Department of State noted that in general, the government respected the basic rights of citizens; however, there were concerns in certain areas such as prison conditions, legal process and discrimination.

Development
Legislative protection of human rights can be seen as a relatively recent development, with the constitution being officially adopted in 1980. The political system operates under a multi-party parliamentary democracy.

Historical situation
The following chart shows Cape Verde's ratings since 1975 in the Freedom in the World reports, published annually by Freedom House. A rating of 1 is "free"; 7, "not free".

International treaties
Cape Verde's stances on international human rights treaties are as follows:

See also 

Freedom of religion in Cape Verde
LGBT rights in Cape Verde
Politics of Cape Verde

Notes 
1.Note that the "Year" signifies the "Year covered". Therefore the information for the year marked 2008 is from the report published in 2009, and so on.
2.As of 8 July (Independence Day) in 1975; 1 January thereafter.
3.The 1982 report covers the year 1981 and the first half of 1982, and the following 1984 report covers the second half of 1982 and the whole of 1983. In the interest of simplicity, these two aberrant "year and a half" reports have been split into three year-long reports through interpolation.

References

External links
 Constitution of Cape Verde
 Amnesty International News Releases 
 Amnesty International's 2011 Annual Report on Cape Verde
 Freedom in the World 2012 Report , by Freedom House

 
Cape Verde
Politics of Cape Verde